Uporny was the sixth ship of the  of the Soviet Navy.

Construction and career
The ship was built at North Nikolayev Shipyard in Mykolaiv and was launched on 14 October 1959 and commissioned into the Black Sea Fleet on 3 December 1960.

In June 1961, after an inter-fleet passage from Sevastopol along the Northern Sea Route to Vladivostok, it became part of the Pacific Fleet of the Soviet Navy. On 19 May 1966, she was reclassified into a large missile ship (BRK). In the period from 26 December 1967 to 22 March 1968, she underwent a major overhaul at Dalzavod Shipyard (Vladivostok).

In 1969, the destroyer carried out combat service in the Indian Ocean, during this period made business calls to Zanzibar (Tanzania), Malé (Maldives), Umm Qasr (Iraq), Bandar Abbas (Iran) and Berber (Somalia). From April 25, 1970, to August 19, 1970, he took part in an exercise and carried out combat service in the Indian Ocean, made business calls to Berbera, Mogadishu, Umm Qasr, Bombay. August - October 1972 - military service in the Pacific Ocean, in the regions of Canada, North America and Hawaii. From 7 February 1977 to 3 February 1978, she was modernized and rebuilt at Dalzavod according to the project 57-A. August 3, 1977 reclassified as large anti-submarine ships.

On June 24, 1991, the destroyer was excluded from the combat composition of the Soviet Navy, disarmed and renamed to the PKZ-12 after conversion into a floating barrack. On June 29, 1993, the floating barracks were excluded from the lists of the Navy ships in connection with the delivery to ARVI for dismantling and sale.

On September 7, 1995, PKZ-12 was sold to an American company for cutting into metal.

References

In Russian

External links
 
 
Gallery of the ship. Navsource. Retrieved 11 August 2021

Ships built at Shipyard named after 61 Communards
Kanin-class destroyers
1959 ships
Cold War destroyers of the Soviet Union